The 2017 Watpac Townsville 400 was a motor racing event for the Supercars Championship, held on the weekend of 7 to 9 July 2017. The event was held at Townsville Street Circuit near Townsville, Queensland and consisted of two races, both 200 kilometres in length. It is the seventh event of fourteen in the 2017 Supercars Championship and hosted Races 13 and 14 of the season.

Background

Driver changes
Aaren Russell was drafted in to replace Cameron McConville at Lucas Dumbrell Motorsport.

References

Townsville 400
Townsville 400